Andrew Youakim (born 5 December 1946), known professionally as Andy Kim, is a Canadian pop rock singer and songwriter. He grew up in Montreal, Quebec. He is known for hits that he released in the late 1960s and 1970s: the international hit "Baby, I Love You" in 1969, and "Rock Me Gently", which topped the U.S. singles chart in 1974. He co-wrote "Sugar, Sugar" in 1968 and sang on the recording as part of the Archies; it was #1 for four weeks and was "Record of the Year" for 1969.

He has recorded under the stage name Baron Longfellow since 1978 or just as Longfellow in the early 1990s. He continues to perform under his original recording name of Andy Kim.

Life and career
Kim was born Andy Youakim on 5 December 1946 in Montreal, the third of four sons of Lebanese immigrants.  In his teens, he moved to New York's Brill Building to pursue a career in music. He recorded as "Andy Kim", using the different last name as a way to obscure his Lebanese ethnicity, though on his earliest releases he used the name "Youakim" in the writing credits.

In 1968, after minor recording successes over the previous few years, Kim released the single "How'd We Ever Get This Way?" on the Steed label; it just missed the U.S. Top 20, reaching #21. He also co-wrote, with Jeff Barry, "Sugar, Sugar" which was a hit single for the Archies, reaching #1 on the U.S. Billboard Hot 100 and ultimately becoming the RIAA Record of the Year. Kim and Barry wrote more songs for the Archies, and also for the Monkees' album Changes in 1970, which Barry produced.

In 1969, Kim had two hit singles, "Rainbow Ride", which made the US Top 50, and "Baby, I Love You", which got to #9 in the US and #1 in Canada; it was so popular in Canada, it earned him a Gold Leaf (Juno) Award in 1970 as his country's Best Male Vocalist. "Baby, I Love You" sold over one million copies, and was awarded a gold disc by the R.I.A.A. in October 1969.

Over the next few years, Kim recorded a few minor hits, including "Be My Baby" and "It's Your Life" (in 1970) and toured North America extensively. In the spring of 1974, he released the self-penned "Rock Me Gently", which went to #1 on the Billboard Hot 100 chart, and to #2 on the UK Singles Chart. "Rock Me Gently" sold three million copies globally, earning Kim his second gold disc.

Kim had shied away from touring for years before then, when he was working with the Steed label. He has said that he had created a person in his music in the vein of a white blond surfer and that fans were shocked to see his dark skin colour and appearance. As well, he had altered his voice on his earlier records to sound younger.

In 1976, Kim altered the spelling of his pseudonym to Andy Kimm, and released a few singles under that name on his own Ice Records label in 1976 and '77.  Shortly thereafter, he adopted the stage name Baron Longfellow and issued the first single ("Shady Hollow Dreamer") under that name in 1978. It was followed by a self-titled album Baron Longfellow with the hit single "Amour" in 1980 and, also under the same pseudonym, in 1984 released Prisoner by Design.  Both of these albums met with moderate success. In 1991, Kim again went by Longfellow and recorded the single "Powerdrive", which received radio airplay on several radio stations across Canada.

In 1995, Kim played at the Kumbaya Festival, at which the Barenaked Ladies were also performing. Nearly a decade later, the band's Ed Robertson convinced Kim to come out of retirement. Robertson co-wrote the song "I Forgot to Mention" with him and offered to produce the track. The single was released on a 5-track EP in 2004 which included a re-recording of "Powerdrive".

In March 2005, Kim received the annual "Indie Award" for Favourite Solo Artist during Canadian Music Week. The music video for "Love Is...", released in the summer of 2005, reached #1 at Bravo.ca. In 2005, he co-wrote "What Ever Happened to Christmas" with Ron Sexsmith. The same year, he established the Andy Kim Christmas Show – a live concert at the Mod Club Theatre in Toronto in which a variety of artists were invited to perform mostly Christmas music. Kim's band acted as house band for the artists, who donated their time for the show. Proceeds were donated to the CHUM/CITY Christmas Wish. The show repeated in 2006, with a similar lineup. Proceeds from the show went to support the Children's Aid Foundation, and the edited show was aired on Mix 99.9 on Christmas Eve and Day. The Andy Kim Christmas show became an annual tradition. The annual show either took place at the Mod Club or Phoenix Concert Theatre in Toronto, with proceeds from the evening donated to a different children's charity each year.

More recently, Kim's music has again come into the public eye, as "Rock Me Gently" was sped up slightly and used by Jeep for their Jeep Liberty commercial ("Pouring In"). His name can be seen on the radio display near the beginning of the commercial.

In 2009, Kim was inducted into the Hit Parade Hall of Fame.

In 2011, E1 Music Canada released Happen Again, Kim's first album since 2004. 

In 2014, he collaborated with Kevin Drew on the album It's Decided, released on 24 February 2015 on Arts & Crafts.

On 23 July 2018, Canada's Walk of Fame included Andy Kim on its list of 2018 inductees. He became part of the Canadian Music Hall of Fame in 2019.

He is married to Sandra Jo Drummond, a former daughter-in-law of Bing Crosby.

Discography

Albums

Compilation albums

Singles

Notes

References

External links
 Official website
 

Canadian male singers
Canadian pop singers
Canadian songwriters
Dot Records artists
Juno Award for Artist of the Year winners
Living people
Singers from Montreal
Songwriters from Quebec
Writers from Montreal
Canadian people of Lebanese descent
Uni Records artists
Year of birth uncertain
Arts & Crafts Productions artists
Anglophone Quebec people
1946 births
Canadian Music Hall of Fame inductees